Andebbia is a fungal genus in the family Mesophelliaceae. The genus is monotypic, containing the single truffle-like species Andebbia pachythrix, found in Australia.

References

External links
 

Fungi of Australia
Hysterangiales
Monotypic Basidiomycota genera
Truffles (fungi)
Taxa named by James Trappe